Pöttsching is a town in the district of Mattersburg in the Austrian state of Burgenland.

The origin of the Hungarian name Pecsenyéd is reported to be from Pechenegs who settled in the area during the Middle Ages.

Population

References

Cities and towns in Mattersburg District
Croatian communities in Burgenland